Cricket Spain is the official governing body of the sport of cricket in Spain. Its current headquarters is located in Alicante, Spain. Cricket Spain is the country's representative at the International Cricket Council and is an associate member being a member of that body since 1992. It is also a member of the European Cricket Council.

Constitution
The details of what is entailed in Cricket Spain can be read using this link.

Clubs in Cricket Spain
There are many clubs that play in various Cricket Tournaments organised by Cricket Spain, both on the mainland as well as in the Balearic Islands, such as Ibiza. 

Costa Del Sol Cricket Club is one of the top Cricket Clubs in Spain; their cricket facility now boasts two dedicated cricket grounds, including seven grass wickets on the Cartama Oval and one artificial wicket at the Victoria Oval, as well as grass wicket practice nets available for pre-season training camps, cricket festivals, tournaments and touring sides.

References

External links
Official website
Spain(ICC-EU)
Spain(Cricinfo)

Spain
Sports governing bodies in Spain